Ishaq II may refer to:

Ishaq II (Hafsid), amir of the Hafsid dynasty
Askia Ishaq II, King of Songhay Empire